Admiral Sir Frederick Hew George Dalrymple-Hamilton KCB (27 March 1890 – 26 December 1974) was a British naval officer who served in World War I and World War II. He was captain of HMS Rodney when it engaged the Bismarck on 27 May 1941.

Naval career
Dalrymple-Hamilton was the son of Col Hon. North de Coigny Dalrymple-Hamilton, MVO, of Bargany, Girvan, Ayrshire, and the grandson of the 10th Earl of Stair. He joined the Royal Navy in 1905 and served in World War I. Promoted to captain in 1931, he was appointed Captain (Destroyers) for the 4th Destroyer Flotilla in 1933 and Captain of the Royal Naval College, Dartmouth in 1936.

From 1939 to 1941 he commanded the battleship  and while in command he took part in the sinking of the German battleship Bismarck. Meanwhile, his son, North Dalrymple-Hamilton, served as a gun director aboard King George V.  After the battle Frederick told his son: "You are lucky to have seen a show like that after only being in the Navy for 18 months – I’ve had to wait 35 years."

He was appointed Admiral Commanding, Iceland in 1941 and Naval Secretary in 1942. A few months later commanded the escorts of several Arctic convoys as well as the British forces involved in the inconclusive Action of 28 January 1945. He went on to be Vice-Admiral Malta and Flag Officer, Central Mediterranean in April 1945.

While serving as Admiral Commanding Iceland, Dalrymple-Hamilton's personal cook was Petty Officer Francis Henry Agnew, who had served on HMS Sheffield during the operations against Bismarck.

After the War he was appointed Flag Officer, Scotland and Northern Ireland and then, from 1948, Admiral at the British Joint Services Mission in Washington D. C.

Family
Frederick Dalyrmple is descended from the 10th Earl of Stair.  The Hon. North de Coigny Dalrymple-Hamilton, the Earl's second son is his father.  His mother is Marcia Liddell, daughter of The Hon. Sir Adolphus Frederick Octavious Liddell and Frederica Elizabeth Lane Fox.

He married Gwendolen Peek in 1918 (died 1974); they had one son and two daughters. Both had royal godparents: son North was a godson of Edward VIII and daughter Graeme Elizabeth was a goddaughter of Queen Elizabeth, the Queen Mother.  Dalrymple-Hamilton's home was at Clady House in Cairnryan, Wigtownshire where he and Gwendolen raised their children.

Their son Captain North Edward Frederick Dalrymple-Hamilton (1921–2014) followed his father into the Royal Navy and became executive officer of the Royal Yacht Britannia.

His and Gwendolen's grandson, North John Frederick, served as a Page of Honour to the Queen Mother.

References

Bibliography
 Pursuit: The Sinking of the Bismarck Ludovic Kennedy
 HMS Rodney, Iain Ballantyne, Pen & Sword Books, Yorkshire, 2008, 
 Killing the Bismarck, Iain Ballantyne, Pen & Sword Books, Yorkshire, 2010, 
 Reports of Proceedings 1921–1964, Rear Admiral G.G.O. Gatacre, Nautical Press & Publications, Sydney, 1982, 

|-

|-

1890 births
1974 deaths
Deputy Lieutenants of Wigtownshire
Royal Navy admirals of World War II
Knights Commander of the Order of the Bath
People from Girvan
Royal Navy officers of World War I
Scottish military personnel
Members of the Royal Company of Archers